Lesley Cooke (born 28th November 1963) is an English cricketer and former member of the England women's cricket team. She played three Test matches against India in 1986, scoring 72 and 117 as an opening batsman on her debut at Wetherby. She was the youngest women at the time to score a century on her test debut. She also appeared in three One Day Internationals against India in the same year. Cooke played domestic cricket for Sussex.

References

External links
 

1963 births
Living people
England women Test cricketers
England women One Day International cricketers
Women cricketers who made a century on Test debut
Sussex women cricketers